Maybole is a town and former burgh of barony and police burgh in South Ayrshire, Scotland. The town is bypassed by the A77.

History 

Maybole has Middle Ages roots, receiving a charter from Donnchadh, Earl of Carrick in 1193. In 1516 it was made a burgh of regality, although for generations it remained under the suzerainty of the Clan Kennedy, afterwards Earls of Cassillis and (later) Marquesses of Ailsa, the most powerful family in Ayrshire. The Marquess of Ailsa lived at Cassillis House, just outside Maybole until its sale in 2007. In the late seventeenth century, a census recorded Maybole was home to 28 "lords and landowners with estates in Carrick and beyond."

In former times, Maybole was the capital of the district of Carrick, Scotland, and for long its characteristic feature was the family mansions of the barons of Carrick. Maybole Castle, a former seat of the Earls of Cassillis, dates to 1560 and still remains, although aspects of the castle are viewed as "of concern". The public buildings include the town-hall, the Ashgrove and the Lumsden fresh-air fortnightly homes, and the Maybole combination poorhouse.

Maybole is a short distance from the birthplace of Robert Burns, the Scots national poet. Burns's mother was a Maybole resident, Agnes Brown.

In the nineteenth century, Maybole became a centre of boot and shoe manufacturing.

Margaret McMurray (??-1760), one of the last native speakers of a Lowland dialect of Scottish Gaelic, is recorded to have lived at Cultezron (not to be confused with nearby Culzean), a farm on the outskirts of Maybole.

Notable landmarks 

This dates from 1777; it stands on a basaltic cliff, beneath which are the Coves of Culzean, once the retreat of outlaws and a resort of the fairies.
 Maybole Town Hall incorporates a tower which dates back to the 16th century.
 Cassillis Castle, near Maybole, is a category A 14th century castle with 17th century and 19th century baronial extensions.
 A primary rail service is at Maybole railway station. Set up in 1860.
  to the south-west are the ruins of Crossraguel (from Crois Riaghail meaning 'Cross of St Regulus' ) Abbey, founded about 1240.
 Our Lady and St Cuthbert Catholic Church in Maybole was opened in 1878 and it was largely funded by Catholic convert Margaret Radclyffe Livingstone Eyre (born Kennedy).
 In the early 20th century, Maybole added a Baptist church. This was admitted to the Baptist Union in 1901 and appointed its first full minister in 1919, a year after the Great War finished.
 Kirkoswald, where Robert Burns spent his seventeenth year, learning land-surveying, lies a little farther west. In the parish churchyard lie the real people who inspired two of Burns's fictitious characters Douglas Graham (Tam o' Shanter) and John Davidson.
 Farther south are the ruins of Turnberry Castle, where Robert the Bruce is said to have been born. A few miles to the north of Culzean are the ruins of Dunure Castle, an ancient stronghold of the Kennedys.

Education 

The town has three primary schools: Cairn Primary, Gardenrose Primary and St Cuthberts Primary.

The secondary school for Maybole is Carrick Academy (a school of Rugby).

Sports 
The local football club, Maybole F. C., play at Ladywell Stadium.

Notable cultural references 
The lyrics of The Waterboys' "Glastonbury Song" include: "I dreamed myself from the sultry plains, To the old green square back in old Maybole ..."

Notable residents
 Sir Gilbert Blane (1749–1834), 18th–century physician and Royal Navy reformer.
 Bernard Fergusson, Baron Ballantrae (1911–1980), part of the Fergusson family, and Governor-General of New Zealand, 1962–67.
 Robert MacBryde (1913–1966), a well-known painter of the 'Modern' school of art and theatre designer.
 John Loudon McAdam (1756–1836), Scottish engineer and roadbuilder of the eighteenth century.
 Norris McWhirter (1925–2004), founder of the Guinness Book of World Records, is descended from the McWhirters of Maybole.
 Sir William Montgomery-Cuninghame (1834–1897), recipient of the Victoria Cross in 1854 during the Crimean War 
 Rev R Guy Ramsay (1895–1976), Scottish Baptist minister and President of the Baptist Union of Scotland, 1948–49.
 Thomas Ramsay (1857–1934), first pastor of Maybole Baptist Church, 1901–19, and President of the Baptist Union of Scotland, 1921–22.
 Rev Dr William King Tweedie (1803–1863), Scottish historian, biographer and minister of the Free Church of Scotland.

Twin towns
 Belœil, Belgium
 Crosne, France
 Schotten, Germany
 Arco, Trentino, Italy

See also
Minishant

References

Sources

External links

 Maybole Home Page 
 About Maybole
 Its page in the Gazetteer for Scotland

 
Towns in South Ayrshire
Carrick, Scotland